Ariel Borrero Alfonso (born January 1, 1972 in Santa Clara) is the starting first baseman for the Cuban national baseball team and for Villa Clara of the Cuban National Series.

In the 2005-06 Cuban National Series, the left-handed Borrero hit .346 to lead Villa Clara. He led the league in doubles and triples in 1999-2000 and 2001, respectively.

Borrero was the starting first baseman for Cuba at the 2006 World Baseball Classic.

References

External links
 

1972 births
Living people
Cuban baseball players
2006 World Baseball Classic players
People from Santa Clara, Cuba